Ashley Warren is a hamlet in the Basingstoke and Deane district of Hampshire, England.

Governance
The village is part of the civil parish of Ecchinswell, Sydmonton and Bishops Green and the Burghclere, Highclere and St Mary Bourne ward of Basingstoke and Deane borough council. The borough council is a Non-metropolitan district of Hampshire County Council.

References

External links

Villages in Hampshire